Solinari may refer to:
Solinari (album), a 1999 album by Morgion
Solinari, Greece, a town in Boeotia